Montlivaltiidae is an extinct family of stony corals.

Genera
The following genera are classified in the family  Montlivaltiidae:

 †Brevimaeandra  Babaev 1964
 †Ceratothecia Turnsek 1972
 †Clausastrea d'Orbigny 1850
 †Coenotheca Quenstedt 1881 
 †Complexastraeopsis Morycowa 1974
 †Complexastraeopsis Sikharulidze 1985
 †Complexastrea d'Orbigny 1850
 †Confusastrea d'Orbigny 1849
 †Cyathophyllia Fromentel 1865
 †Cyathophylliopsis Beauvais 1970
 †Dimorphocoenia de Fromentel 1857
 †Elasmophyllia d'Achiardi 1875
 †Ellipsosmilia d'Orbigny 1849
 †Goldfussastraea Beauvais 1964
 †Goldfussastrea Beauvais 1964
 †Isastrea Milne-Edwards & Haime, 1851
 †Mapucheastrea Morsch 1996
 †Margarastreopsis Beauvais 1964
 †Montlivaltia Lamouroux, 1821 
 †Montlivaltiinae Dietrich 1926
 †Nerthastraea Chevalier 1961
 †Neuquinosmilia Morsch 1991
 †Paraclausastraea Zlatarski 1968
 †Paraphyllogyra Beauvais 1970
 †Peplosmilia Milne-Edwards and Haime 1850 
 †Placosmilia Milne Edwards & Haime, 1848
 †Placosmiliinae Alloiteau 1952
 †Puschastraea Roniewicz 1966
 †Rhabdophyllia Milne-Edwards & Haime, 1851
 †Thecomeandra Eliasova 1973
 †Thecosmilia Milne-Edwards and Haime 1848
 †Trochophyllia Alloiteau 1952
 †Trochosmilia Milne-Edwards and Haime 1848

References

External links
 

Scleractinia